Flykälen is a village of Krokom Municipality, Jämtland County in northern Sweden. The population is about 23. Every summer there is a tractor pulling event with old tractors and each Easter an ice fishing competition. The school in Flykälen was built 1891–1893. A new school was inaugurated 1947, but today the children of Flykälen have to travel to Laxsjö.

References

External links
http://www.flykalen.se/
 Old pictures from Flykälen

See also
Krokom
Föllinge
Yxskaftkälen

Populated places in Krokom Municipality
Jämtland